Señal Colombia is a Colombian public Terrestrial television, which offers opinion, informative, entertainment, educational, sports and cultural content and is part of RTVC Sistema de Medios Públicos.

History
Señal Colombia began its broadcasts on February 9, 1970 as Channel 11 (because it was broadcast on frequency 11 of the VHF band of Bogotá) in order to provide educational and popular programming for adults, imitating the television model of the BBC with two national channels: the first of a general nature and the second with a more cultural and minority focus. In this way, in Colombia Televisora Nacional de Colombia would be the generalist channel and Channel 11 the cultural channel.

The first images of the channel were produced from the auditorium of Inravisión. During the inauguration of Channel 11, the communications minister of the time, Antonio Díaz García, and the director of the National Television of Colombia, Fernando Restrepo Suárez. In the words of the director of the National Televisora de Colombia, the channel "would not be a formula to bridge cultural gaps nor did it intend to replace the work of the teacher, but it would serve as a great audiovisual aid to fill those cultural gaps present in all levels of education".

After the private station Teletigre was expropriated by the State in 1971, it expanded its coverage nationwide in January 1974 and was replaced by Segunda Cadena, while Televisora Nacional was rebranded Primera Cadena; and Channel 11 changes its name to Tercera Cadena or "Channel of public interest".

In 1984, Channel 3 is renamed Chain 3 - Channel of public interest; Finally, in 1992 it changed its name to Channel 3 and from December 1995 it acquired its current name as Señal Colombia.

On March 21, 2021, the newscast RTVC Noticias was launched and that this is the second State newscast of Colombian television after Tele Noticias for the programming of Audiovisuales.

Programming
Since its inception, the channel has always had a vocation for public service, broadcasting cultural and educational programming. During the last years of Inravisión, Señal Colombia broadcast sessions of the Senate and the House of Representatives, in addition to other programs of an institutional nature, but in 2004 this programming was transferred to Canal Institucional, which replaced Canal A (former Second Chain).

Señal Colombia broadcasts children's programs, documentaries, family films, international films and independent films, newscasts, fiction, among other things. This has made the channel considerably increase its popularity.

The channel has broadcast numerous national and international sporting events, such as the Olympic Games, Paralympic Games, Pan American Games, Central American and Caribbean Games, Bolivarian Games, and National Games of Colombia, as well as the Grand Tours and other road cycling races.

References

External links 
  

Television networks in Colombia
Television channels and stations established in 1970
Spanish-language television stations